3I or 3-I may refer to:

Iniziative Industriali Italiane
3I Sky Arrow
3i London-based private equity and venture capital company
3-I League, see Illinois–Indiana–Iowa League
3i Infrastructure, an investment business headquartered in Jersey
3i Infotech Limited, an Indian IT company
ESX Server 3i, a version of VMware ESX

See also
I3 (disambiguation)